St. Xavier's College, Kothavara, is a general degree college located in Kothavara, Kottayam district, Kerala. It was established in the year 1981. The college is affiliated with Mahatma Gandhi University. This college offers different courses in arts, commerce and science.

Departments

Science

Physics
Chemistry
Mathematics
Botany
Zoology

Arts and Commerce

Malayalam
English
Hindi
History
Political Science
Economics
Physical Education
Commerce

Accreditation
The college is  recognized by the University Grants Commission (UGC).

References

External links

Universities and colleges in Kottayam district
Educational institutions established in 1981
1981 establishments in Kerala
Arts and Science colleges in Kerala
Colleges affiliated to Mahatma Gandhi University, Kerala